Gran Evangelical Lutheran Church is a historic church in Popple Township, Clearwater County, Minnesota. Gran Church in Clearwater County is situated near the junction of Clearwater County Road 45 and 20 outside Bagley, Minnesota.

The log constructed church was built in 1897 by Ole Eneberg, during a time when that portion of Minnesota was just starting to be settled.  Lumber companies were moving into north-central Minnesota to harvest the pine forests there, and homesteaders were following the loggers and establishing farms there.  A group of Norwegian immigrants started the area's first church congregation. They hired Reverend G.P. Nesseth (1867-1937) who was doing missionary work in the area after being educated at Luther College in Decorah, Iowa.  Reverend Nesseth and his congregation were members of the Synod of the Norwegian Evangelical Lutheran Church in America.  Church services were held in the homes of church members for the first two years until the congregation built this structure between April and July 1897.

The congregation continued to worship in the log building until 1953, when they merged with another local congregation and established Our Savior's Lutheran Church in Ebro, Minnesota.  In 1973, the Clearwater County Historical Society placed a plaque on the building recognizing it as "the first church built in Clearwater County".  It was listed on the National Register of Historic Places in 1988.

References

External links
 Clearwater County Historical Society

Lutheran churches in Minnesota
Churches on the National Register of Historic Places in Minnesota
Churches completed in 1897
Buildings and structures in Clearwater County, Minnesota
Norwegian-American culture in Minnesota
National Register of Historic Places in Clearwater County, Minnesota
Log buildings and structures on the National Register of Historic Places in Minnesota
1897 establishments in Minnesota